Luca Matteotti (born 14 October 1989) is an Italian snowboarder. He has represented Italy at the 2014 Winter Olympics in Sochi.

References

1989 births
Snowboarders at the 2014 Winter Olympics
Living people
Olympic snowboarders of Italy
Italian male snowboarders
21st-century Italian people